Inferior pulvinar nucleus (nucleus pulvinaris inferior) is one of four traditionally anatomically distinguished nuclei of the pulvinar of the thalamus. The other three nuclei of the pulvinar are called lateral, anterior and medial pulvinar nuclei.

Connections

Afferent  
 Inferior pulvinar nucleus, together with its lateral and medial nuclei, receives afferent input from superior colliculus.

Efferent 
 Inferior pulvinar nucleus, together with its lateral nucleus, both have projections to the early visual cortical areas.

Functions 
 Inferior pulvinar nucleus, together with its lateral and medial nuclei, is thought to be important for the initiation and compensation of saccadic movements of the eyes. Those nuclei also participate in the visual attention regulation.

Clinical significance
Lesions of the inferior pulvinar nucleus can result in neglect syndromes and attentional deficits.

References 

Pulvinar nuclei